James Brock Gutierrez (born September 25, 1973) is a former American football center who played for nine seasons in the NFL.

Early life and college career
While attending Charlotte High School in Charlotte, Michigan, Gutierrez won All-State honors in football and wrestling.

Attending Central Michigan University as a history major, Brock was a three-year starter at center for the Central Michigan Chippewas football team. As a junior, he led his team to the 1994 Mid-American Conference (MAC) title. He was on the All-MAC first-team as a senior in 1995.

Professional career
Gutierrez signed with the Cincinnati Bengals as an undrafted free agent following the 1996 NFL Draft. With five appearances off the bench, he had his first regular season game action in 1997 with the Bengals. In 1998, Gutierrez was waived on August 30, re-signed on November 4, and waived again on November 17. He then signed with the Jacksonville Jaguars practice squad November 30 before returning to the Bengals on December 15 and appearing in one game that season. He remained with the Bengals until 2002. He later played for the San Francisco 49ers from 2003 to 2004 and Detroit Lions in 2005. In his career, Gutierrez played a total of 114 games with 23 starts.

References

1973 births
Living people
American football offensive linemen
Central Michigan Chippewas football players
Jacksonville Jaguars players
Cincinnati Bengals players
San Francisco 49ers players
Detroit Lions players
People from Charlotte, Michigan
Players of American football from Michigan